The 21st government of Turkey (17 May 1954 – 9 December 1955) was a government in the history of Turkey. It is also called "the third Menderes government".

Background 
The Democrat Party (DP) won the elections held on 2 May 1954. President Celal Bayar appointed Adnan Menderes to form the new government.

The government
In the list below, the cabinet members who served only a part of the cabinet's lifespan are shown in the column "Notes".

Aftermath
Although the government had the support of the majority in the parliament, Adnan Menderes resigned because of a political crisis about press freedom, called the "right to prove". Following this resignation, a group of MPs left the DP to form the Liberty Party.

References

Cabinets of Turkey
Democrat Party (Turkey, 1946–1961) politicians
1954 establishments in Turkey
1955 disestablishments in Turkey
Cabinets established in 1954
Cabinets disestablished in 1955
Members of the 21st government of Turkey
10th parliament of Turkey
Democrat Party (Turkey, 1946–1961)